Siitupe Marcus "Tupe" Peko, (born September 19, 1978) is a former American Football offensive guard. Peko attended La Serna High School and first played at the collegiate level at Cerritos College before transferring to Michigan State University. He played in the NFL for 4 years, at first primarily as a backup and started in 11 games including playoffs before injuries plagued Peko. He was drafted in the seventh round of the 2001 NFL Draft. He has played for the New York Jets, Indianapolis Colts, and Green Bay Packers. Peko is married to Valerie Peko and has 3 sons. Currently Peko works as a police officer with the Indianapolis Metropolitan Police Department.

He is the older brother of Arizona Cardinals defensive tackle Domata Peko. He is also a cousin of football player Fou Fonoti.

References

External links
Just Sports Stats
Tupe Peko at NFL.com
Tupe Peko at NFL Players.com

1978 births
Living people
American football offensive guards
Amsterdam Admirals players
Cerritos Falcons football players
Indianapolis Colts players
Michigan State Spartans football players
Sportspeople from Whittier, California
American sportspeople of Samoan descent
Players of American football from California
Las Vegas Gladiators players
Utah Blaze players